FKS may refer to:

Sport 
 FK Sarajevo, a Bosnian football club
 FK Smederevo 1924, a Serbian football club
 Formula Kart Stars, a British karting championship

Transport 
 Focus Air Cargo, an American airline
 Frankfort Dow Memorial Field, in Michigan, United States
 Fukushima Airport, in Japan